Mandeni (also Mandini) is a town in Ilembe District Municipality in the KwaZulu-Natal province of South Africa.

The town is roughly 22 km north-east of Stanger.

The town has four shopping centres, namely;  Mandeni shopping centre, where most residents go, Sundumbili plaza, Gcaleka Shopping centre  (also known as KwaGcaleka) and seven townships. The town has many factories and attracts workers from afar.  The biggest employer is Sappi, the largest paper manufacturer in South Africa.

The Tugela River flows through Mandeni and the mouth of the river is 10 km from the town center.  Mandeni is located 22 km from Stanger and 96 km from Durban.

Notable people
 Vusi Ximba, musician
Zamakhetheka Ntshulane, sneaker designer

References

Populated places in the Mandeni Local Municipality